Reichenbach-Steegen is a municipality in the district of Kaiserslautern, in Rhineland-Palatinate, western Germany. It has a twin town in France, Magny-en-Vexin.

References

Municipalities in Rhineland-Palatinate
Kaiserslautern (district)